Ardrossan is a town in Scotland. 

Ardrossan may also refer to:

 Ardrossan, South Australia, a town in Australia
 Ardrossan, Alberta, a Canadian hamlet
 HMS Ardrossan (J131), a Royal Navy minesweeper
 The estate of Helen Hope Montgomery Scott on Philadelphia's Main Line
 Ardrossan Shipbuilding Company, a company in Ardrossan since 1842 to 1969